MS Seatruck Point is owned and operated by Seatruck Ferries. Built by Spanish shipyard Astilleros de Huelva, Clipper Point  entered service on 21 March 2008.

History
Clipper Point was launched in 2006, and christened on 7 October. She is the first of four "P Series" ships for Seatruck. Her speed of  enables crossing times between Liverpool and Dublin to be reduced to six hours. Older ships like the Riverdance and Moondance took nine and a half hours to do the same journey.

In May 2012, Clipper Point was charted to DFDS and deployed on the Cuxhaven–Immingham route.

Description
Seatruck Point is one of four "P Series" ro-ro freight ferries. Det Norske Veritas class the vessel as a 1A1 General Cargo Carrier - with whom Clipper Point is allocated the number 26467.

The vessel is designed to fit in Heysham harbour ("Heysham max"). Trailers are carried over three decks.

The vessel is powered by two Wärtsilä 8L46 diesel engines which drive two controllable pitch propellers. The vessel is also equipped with two Wärtsilä CT200 bow thrusters.

Sister Vessels
Clipper Pace
Clipper Panorama
Clipper Pennant

References

External links

Seatruck Ferries
Photo of Clipper Point

Ships of Seatruck Ferries
Ferries of the United Kingdom
Merchant ships of Cyprus
2006 ships
Ships built in Spain